Colobaea punctata is a species of marsh fly in the family Sciomyzidae.

Distribution
Europe.

References

Sciomyzidae
Insects described in 1923
Diptera of Europe
Taxa named by William Lundbeck